Kungsportsplatsen is a square in the city centre of Gothenburg, Sweden. The gate was the main entrance to the fortified city, which was and still is surrounded by a moat. When the city grew outside the moat and there was no need to defend the city any longer the gate was torn down.

At Kungsportsplatsen there is a statue of King Charles IX, which was placed there in 1936.

Squares in Gothenburg
1852 establishments in Sweden